Radivoje "Rade" Kalajdzic (born 27 July 1991) is an American professional boxer of Serbian ethnicity.

Kalajdzic turned pro in 2011.
On 18 October 2013, Kalajdzic took out light heavyweight Otis Griffin in just 1 round. Kalajdzic lost a highly controversial decision to Marcus Browne 16 April 2016 fight for the WBC United States title, which broke his undefeated streak. He was officially the IBU Champion in 2014. His three-seconds knockout of Fabio Garrido on 13 November 2015 was met with criticism. As of 2015 he is part of Lou DiBella's promotion team.

Personal life
Born in Zenica, SR Bosnia and Herzegovina (at the time SFR Yugoslavia), his family fled the Bosnian War in 1992 first to Bijeljina in Republika Srpska, and then to Čačak in Serbia, and after 7 years as refugees they moved to the United States, to Saint Petersburg, Florida in 1998. His father Marko trained boxing in his youth, and at 14 years he started boxing at a Florida gym. He wears the Serbian tricolour and "SRB" on his shorts. He wears tattoos of Eastern Orthodox iconography.

Professional boxing record

References

External links
 
 

Living people
1991 births
Serbian male boxers
American male boxers
American people of Serbian descent
Refugees in Serbia
Bosnia and Herzegovina emigrants to the United States
Cruiserweight boxers